The 9th IAAF World Indoor Championships in Athletics were held in the National Indoor Arena in Birmingham, UK from 14 to 16 March 2003. It was the first time the Championships had been held in the UK. There were a total number of 589 participating athletes from 133 countries.

Results

Men
1999 | 2001 | 2003 | 2004 | 2006

1 The United States (James Davis, Jerome Young, Milton Campbell, and Tyree Washington; Derrick Brew ran in the heats) originally won gold in 3:04.09, but were disqualified after Young tested positive for steroids in 2004.

Women
1999 | 2001 | 2003 | 2004 | 2006

1 Zhanna Block of Ukraine originally won the 60 m in 7.04, but was disqualified in 2011 for doping offences.

2 Michelle Collins of the USA originally won the 200 m in 22.18, but was disqualified in 2005 due to the BALCO scandal.

Medal table

Participating nations

 (2)
 (4)
 (1)
 (1)
 (1)
 (5)
 (7)
 (1)
 (10)
 (1)
 (1)
 (9)
 (2)
 (1)
 (2)
 (9)
 (4)
 (1)
 (3)
 (7)
 (1)
 (1)
 (1)
 (1)
 (10)
 (1)
 (2)
 (1)
 (3)
 (11)
 (1)
 (9)
 (3)
 (1)
 (2)
 (5)
 (5)
 (23)
 (1)
 (10)
 (2)
 (34)
 (10)
 (1)
 (1)
 (1)
 (2)
 (1)
 (7)
 (2)
 (1)
 (1)
 (10)
 (1)
 (19)
 (20)
 (3)
 (2)
 (6)
 (1)
 (1)
 (2)
 (1)
 (1)
 (1)
 (1)
 (1)
 (1)
 (1)
 (1)
 (1)
 (2)
 (1)
 (1)
 (1)
 (1)
 (9)
 (1)
 (1)
 (1)
 (10)
 (1)
 (3)
 (1)
 (1)
 (1)
 (1)
 (1)
 (1)
 (1)
 (1)
 (15)
 (7)
 (1)
 (1)
 (11)
 (42)
 (1)
 (1)
 (1)
 (1)
 (1)
 (1)
 (1)
 (2)
 (2)
 (2)
 (10)
 (1)
 (4)
 (27)
 (2)
 (1)
 (1)
 (12)
 (3)
 (1)
 (1)
 (1)
 (1)
 (2)
 (4)
 (2)
 (1)
 (1)
 (24)
 (49)
 (1)
 (1)
 (1)
 (1)

See also
 2003 in athletics (track and field)

References

External links
IAAF Official Website
Athletics Australia

 
IAAF World Indoor Championships
IAAF World Indoor Championships
World Athletics Indoor Championships
A
International athletics competitions hosted by England
March 2003 sports events in the United Kingdom
2000s in Birmingham, West Midlands